Sogaon is a village in the Karmala taluka of Solapur district in Maharashtra state, India.

Demographics
Covering  and comprising 519 households at the time of the 2011 census of India, Sogaon had a population of 2533. There were 1319 males and 1214 females, with 369 people being aged six or younger.

References

Villages in Karmala taluka